"Peaches" is a song by Canadian singer Justin Bieber, featuring vocals from fellow Canadian singer-songwriter Daniel Caesar and American singer-songwriter Giveon. It was released through Def Jam Recordings on March 19, 2021, as the fifth single from Bieber's sixth studio album, Justice, along with the album. Bieber, Caesar, and Giveon wrote the song with producers Harv and Shndo, alongside Andrew Watt, Louis Bell, Sean Leon, Harv's wife, Felisha King-Harvey, Vincent Massi, and Keavan Yazdani. There are two remixes of the song: one that features American rapper Ludacris, American singer-songwriter Usher, and American rapper Snoop Dogg, and the other of which features Nigerian singers Alpha P and Omah Lay that is remixed by Nigerian record producer Masterkraft. "Peaches" marks the first time that Bieber, Caesar, and Giveon have collaborated with each other.

"Peaches" debuted atop the Billboard Hot 100, giving Bieber his seventh number-one hit on the chart, while it gave both Caesar and Giveon their first number-one. Elsewhere, the song topped simultaneously both the Billboard Global 200 and Global Excl. U.S., as well as charts in Australia, Canada, Denmark, Ireland, New Zealand, Norway, Portugal, Singapore and Slovakia. It also peaked within the top ten of the record charts in the United Kingdom and 20 other countries. It received four nominations at the 64th Annual Grammy Awards; Record of the Year, Song of the Year, Best R&B Performance, and Best Music Video.

Background
Bieber started to write the chorus of "Peaches" while hanging out with Shawn Mendes and Andrew Watt at the latter's house. Watt showed Bieber around his home studio and told him to "go play the drums". After having recorded a drum beat, Bieber sat down at the piano and played some chords, which they also recorded and looped. Watt then recorded some bass and guitar and Bieber started "just talking words back and forth for fun". After the session, Bieber asked Watt to send him the demo so he could work on it some more by himself. Bieber posted a snippet of the song of him singing the chorus while playing the piano on his Instagram account on September 7, 2020. Record producer Shndo later listened to it and decided to further produce the song. He screen-recorded the Instagram video, recorded some drums over it in the music software Ableton and decided to speed up the song. Record producer Harv then added some more instruments to the song. Shndo and Harv presented the song to Bieber, who loved it and later re-recorded the chorus and wrote a verse before sending it back to the producers to work on it some more. On the same day, Bieber contacted Giveon, who accepted to be a part of the song. Bieber later asked Daniel Caesar to also be a part of the track.

Composition and lyrics
"Peaches" is a laid-back pop, R&B, pop-soul, and trap ballad that cruises along over a mid-tempo funk groove and laced with a West Coast bounce. It has been described as "colorful", "sun-dappled" and "slinky". Musically, the song is set in the key of C major and has a tempo of 90 beats per minute. It follows a simple four-chord structure of F major–E minor–D minor–C major. Bieber's voice has "a bright, pliable timbre" applied to it in the chorus and his verse, delivering his lines with a "pop twang". Caesar croons over his verse with a "smooth" delivery, while Giveon's vocals have a "silky baritone" to them. The track opens with a muted, "battered upright" piano part that becomes the song's backbone before introducing "leisurely" licks produced by an electric guitar. Additional synth layers are present at a chorus breakdown after the third verse, consisting of a string pad, synth lead and a subtly reversed pad. The song closes out instrumentally with a synth solo.

Lyrically, "Peaches" is a love song where Bieber, Caesar, and Giveon sing about their well-established relationships. The first verse finds Bieber alluding to a long-lasting romance: "There's nothing like your touch / It's the way you lift me up / And I'll be right here with you 'til the end." Zach Seemayer‍ of Entertainment Tonight suggested that the song was written with Bieber's wife Hailey Baldwin in mind. The chorus, which is "a sweet ode to different regions" and repeated seven times, is sung in a "call-and-response" style that intercuts each artist's verse, where Bieber professes to "get[ting] his peaches in Georgia and his weed from California". He also mentions "get[ting his] light right from the source", which some critics have speculated to be a religious reference that refers to God. On Caesar's verse, Boston Globe correspondent Maura Johnston drew comparisons between it and the music of American singer-songwriter Maxwell. She wrote that the "besotted" verse "lyrically recalls the romanticism of Maxwell's most lovelorn work". Giveon brings a sense of urgency to his voice in his verse as he sings the line: "Done being distracted / The one I need is right in my arms."

Promotion
To promote "Peaches", Bieber teamed up with cannabis company Palms to launch a cannabis line that is titled after the song on October 4, 2021. Bieber explained his reasoning for starting the line, telling Vogue, "Weed was something that I felt people tried to make me feel bad for enjoying." He added, "But I've now found a place in my life for weed products that have been beneficial in my human experience".

Critical reception
"Peaches" received critical acclaim upon its release. Billboard critic Jason Lipshutz ranked it as the second-best song on Justice, writing that Peaches' flips the script with vivacious R&B energy" and "levitat[es] off the ground with Giveon and Daniel Caesar along for the top-down ride". Elamin Abdelmahmoud of BuzzFeed News considered "Peaches" to be the best song on Justice and "a career high for Bieber". Valerie Magan of Consequence of Sound deemed it the standout track on Justice and called it "a colorful, R&B-adjacent fever dream". Exclaim!s Rosemary Akpan shared a similar sentiment, listing the song as one of Justices standouts. Jon Caramanica wrote for The New York Times that the track "finds Bieber at his most vocally flexible" and regarded it as the most successful collaboration on Justice. Roisin O'Connor of The Independent and Mikael Wood of the Los Angeles Times referred to it as an album highlight. Sumiko Wilson of Complex Canada stated that the song "embodies the R&B sound" that Bieber "thought he was tapping into" on his previous album Changes.

Ana Clara Ribeiro from PopMatters viewed Caesar and Giveon as "strong collaborators" who "steal the spotlight" on "Peaches". Alex Zidel of HotNewHipHop felt that the track "will be a lasting success well into the summer season", writing that its chorus "will leave you humming the melody for days on end". Gabriella Ferlita of Gigwise called it "effortlessly sumptuous" and "a deliciously fictitious musical affair between the sounds of Anderson Paak and Jack Johnson". NMEs Will Lavin described the song as "the ultimate pick-me-up" that "invit[es] visions of beach drives with the top down". Stereogums Chris DeVille felt that "the song's loose, easygoing neo-soul vibe is hard to deny". Bianca Gracie of Uproxx said that the song's breeziness "compliments Bieber's sonic effortlessness", but thought it might have worked better if Caesar and Giveon were substituted for other artists who are better representations of the song's mentioned locations and flow.

Accolades

Commercial performance
In the United States, "Peaches" debuted atop the Billboard Hot 100 chart dated March 30, 2021, becoming the 50th song to debut at number one, and giving Bieber his seventh number-one single and 23rd top-ten hit. "Peaches" started with 30.6 million US streams, becoming his fifth number-one song on Streaming Songs chart, at the No. 3 on Digital Songs chart with sales of 16,000 units, and attracted 12.1 million radio airplay audience impressions. Due to the song reaching the summit, Bieber tied Canadian rapper and singer Drake as the only male artists with four number-one entrances on the chart. The song additionally became both Caesar and Giveon's first number-one single on the chart. With the song's parent album, Justice, entering the Billboard 200 at the top position in the same week, Bieber became the third artist to debut at number one on both charts simultaneously, following BTS and Taylor Swift in 2020, as well as the first male soloist to do so. "Peaches" subsequently topped the Rhythmic Airplay and Pop Airplay charts, becoming Bieber's fifth and eighth leader, respectively.

In the United Kingdom, "Peaches" debuted at number one on the Official Trending Chart dated March 23, 2021. It entered the UK Singles Chart at number three, earning Bieber the week's highest new entry. The song rose to a new peak of number two on its third week on the chart, maintaining its position for four consecutive weeks. In Ireland, "Peaches" debuted atop the Irish Singles Chart and became Bieber's seventh number one single. Bieber also claimed the Official Irish Chart Double as Justice debuted at number one on the Irish Albums Chart. In Australia, "Peaches" debuted at number two on the ARIA Singles Chart. The song peaked at number one on its third week on the chart, becoming Bieber's fourth number one single and earning him a chart double with Justice spending a second non-consecutive week atop the national albums chart. The song stayed at the top position the following week. In New Zealand, "Peaches" entered the singles chart at number one and held the position for six consecutive weeks, earning Bieber his tenth number-one single in the country.

Live performances
Bieber performed a solo stripped-down version of "Peaches" at NPR's Tiny Desk Concert on March 17, 2021, two days before the song's official release. The song was performed alongside previously released singles "Holy", "Anyone", and "Hold On". On May 25, 2021, Bieber performed a medley of "Peaches" and "Hold On" on the twentieth-season finale of The Voice. Bieber performed a stripped-back rendition of "Peaches" along with "Hold On", "Love You Different", and "Somebody" during the iHeartRadio Wango Tango on June 30, 2021. On April 3, 2022, Bieber performed a stripped back version of "Peaches" on his piano at the 64th Annual Grammy Awards, where the song was up for four nominations. He was later joined by collaborators Daniel Caesar and Giveon, as well as a full band, in the second half of the performance.

Music video
The official music video for "Peaches", directed by Colin Tilley, was released alongside the song and album on March 19, 2021. Bieber teased the clip by sharing images of himself with Caesar and Giveon over social media days before its release. The video sees the three singing through various locations filled with technicolored visuals. It follows Bieber, Caesar, and Giveon driving a vintage car as they cruise down city streets illuminated by neon lights. The scene utilizes a projector and backdrop to make the stage look like a moving highway. While Bieber and Giveon sit in the car and take turns driving, Caesar appears relaxing on the hood or lying on the roof of the moving vehicle multiple times throughout the video. Bieber also dances through a hallway among large neon lettering that spells out the song's name. He wears a series of street-style outfits, including a puffer jacket, plaid shirt, baggy jeans, and knitted cap, before flaunting a peach-colored suit inside a dome structure with soft lighting and mirrors.

Credits and personnel
Credits adapted from Tidal and Jaxsta.

 Justin Bieber – lead vocals, songwriting
 Daniel Caesar – featured artist, lead vocals, songwriting
 Giveon – featured artist, lead vocals, songwriting
 Harv – songwriting, production, bass, guitar, keyboards, piano
 Shndo – songwriting, production
 Aaron Simmonds – songwriting
 Andrew Watt – songwriting, vocal engineering, vocal production
 Felisha King – songwriting
 Keavan Yazdani – songwriting
 Louis Bell – songwriting
 Matthew Sean Leon – songwriting
 Colin Leonard – mastering
 Josh Gudwin – mixing, vocal engineering, vocal production
 Heidi Wang – assistant mixing
 Ryan Lytle – assistant record engineering

Charts

Weekly charts

Monthly charts

Year-end charts

Certifications

Remix

Background and lyrics
A remix of the song, featuring American rappers Ludacris and Snoop Dogg, as well as American singer Usher, was released on June 7, 2021. The remix came hours after Bieber performed the Justice track "Somebody" at the 2021 Juno Awards. Snoop Dogg teased a part of his verse a day before release through a Twitter exchange, questioning Bieber "where [he]'s been" before the latter asked the rest of his collaborators if they were "around tonight". It marks Bieber's first collaboration with Snoop Dogg; he had previously collaborated with Ludacris on the songs "Baby" and "All Around the World" and with Usher on "Somebody to Love".

Ludacris, Usher and Snoop Dogg take over most of the choruses and verses handled by Bieber, Caesar and Giveon in the original. Ludacris begins the remix with bars of adornment and love regarding his relationship: "I'm always gon' adore ya', kiss you and caress you / Anything just to spoil ya, gift ya', protect ya." Bieber slips in to sing the second verse and the chorus before handing it off to Usher, who "recounts an encounter with a woman from Decatur" and introduces "tight, breathy harmonies" into the third verse. As a resident of Atlanta, Usher also pays homage to his longtime home: "Wonder where she learn to bounce that booty / What's her secret? I bet her momma went to Freaknik." Snoop Dogg, who declares himself as the "ambassador of legalization", raps about the finest stuff coming out of California in the final verse: "Whole VIP smellin' like it's Christmas, you don't wanna miss this / California weed on 10, this hits different."

Reception
Rolling Stones Jon Blistein felt that the guest artists were "a perfect fit" for the song's "slick and breezy beat". Mitch Findlay of HotNewHipHop believed that Ludacris and Usher brought new energy into the remix, while Snoop Dogg's charisma kept him engaging throughout his rapping. Robert Rowat from CBC Music called the remix "marvelous" and gave it a recommendation if one is "tire[d] of the original version". The Globe and Mails Brad Wheeler referred to it as "a pungent remix". Tom Breihan of Stereogum found the remix to be musically uninteresting, but commented that "there's something fun about seeing [the featured artists] showing up on this song together". Clover Hope wrote for Pitchfork that "[a] smooth-as-ever Usher salvages the remix from transient houseguests Ludacris and Snoop Dogg" as he "add[s] lived-in harmonies to an already suave song".

Release history

See also 
 List of Billboard Global 200 number ones of 2021
 List of Billboard Hot 100 number ones of 2021
 List of Billboard Hot 100 number-one singles of the 2020s
 List of Canadian Hot 100 number-one singles of 2021
 List of number-one singles of 2021 (Australia)
 List of number-one singles of 2021 (Ireland)
 List of number-one singles from the 2020s (New Zealand)
 List of number-one songs of 2021 (Singapore)

References

2020s ballads
2021 singles
2021 songs
Billboard Hot 100 number-one singles
Canadian Hot 100 number-one singles
Justin Bieber songs
Songs written by Justin Bieber
Daniel Caesar songs
Songs written by Daniel Caesar
Giveon songs
Songs written by Giveon
Ludacris songs
Songs written by Ludacris
Usher (musician) songs
Songs written by Usher (musician)
Snoop Dogg songs
Songs written by Snoop Dogg
Songs written by Harv
Songs written by Andrew Watt (record producer)
Songs written by Louis Bell
Song recordings produced by Harv
Music videos directed by Colin Tilley
Def Jam Recordings singles
Irish Singles Chart number-one singles
Number-one singles in Australia
Number-one singles in Denmark
Number-one singles in India
Number-one singles in New Zealand
Number-one singles in Norway
Number-one singles in Portugal
Number-one singles in Singapore
Billboard Global 200 number-one singles
Billboard Global Excl. U.S. number-one singles
Songs about cannabis
Soul ballads
Pop ballads
Contemporary R&B ballads